Jérémie Broh (born 21 March 1997) is an Italian footballer of Ivorian descent. He plays as a midfielder for  club Palermo.

Club career
Broh made his Serie A debut for Parma on 18 May 2015 in a game against Fiorentina.

On 30 July 2019, he joined Cosenza on loan.

On 25 September 2020 he signed a three-year contract with Palermo.

On 31 August 2021, he was loaned to Südtirol. After winning promotion to Serie B with Südtirol, Broh returned to Palermo, being named part of the first team squad for the 2022–23 Serie B season.

Career statistics

Club

References

External links
 

1997 births
Living people
Italian people of Ivorian descent
Italian sportspeople of African descent
Sportspeople from Parma
Italian footballers
Association football midfielders
Serie A players
Serie B players
Serie C players
Parma Calcio 1913 players
U.S. Sassuolo Calcio players
Pordenone Calcio players
F.C. Südtirol players
Calcio Padova players
Cosenza Calcio players
Palermo F.C. players
Italy youth international footballers
Footballers from Emilia-Romagna